Keningau is the capital of the Keningau District in the Interior Division of Sabah, Malaysia. It is the fifth-largest town in Sabah, as well one of the oldest. Keningau is between Tambunan and Tenom. The town had an estimated population of 173,130.

Etymology and history 
The name Keningau is derived from the locally-abundant Javanese cinnamon tree (Cinnamomum burmannii) which is locally known as koningau. The tree is known as 'Kayu Manis' in Malay and is sometimes referred to as the 'king of spices'. Its bark was collected by the British North Borneo Company to be sold as a spice. During the British colonial era, Keningau was one of the most important administrative centres in British North Borneo.

The Japanese used Keningau as one of its main administrative centres during their occupation of North Borneo in World War II.

Town divisions

Keningau 1 
The Keningau 1 is south of the Keningau Town. There is a vibrant commercial district with some of historical 'shop-houses.'

Keningau 2/New Town 
Keningau 2 is the New Town, to the north of Keningau. The New Town houses the new Keningau Hospital. There are shops, shopping malls, and school.

Demographics

Ethnicity and religion 
Keningau's population was estimated in 2010 at 5,565. Of the total, 90% are Dusuns and Muruts, 8% are Chinese (of whom most are proportionally divided into Hakkas and Taishanese); the balance is divided between other indigenous Sabahan races and foreign immigrants (legal and illegal) from the Philippines and Indonesia. The latter group forms a disproportionately large part of the population of Keningau as many of these immigrants come to seek employment in the many agricultural plantations in the district.

Languages 
Apart from their native languages, the indigenous Sabahan ethnicities in Keningau mostly speak English, Malay (albeit a distinct Sabahan creole form of it). The ethnic Chinese population speak Sze Yup (a dialect of Cantonese), Hakka and Mandarin (varieties of Chinese) among themselves, but generally speak Malay when interacting with members of the indigenous races.

Most of the Indonesian and Filipino immigrants speak Malay in addition to their native languages.

Climate
Keningau has a tropical rainforest climate (Af) with heavy rainfall year-round.

Places of interest

Keningau Oath Stone 
This monument was erected to commemorate Sabah's entrance into the federation of Malaysia by Garukon Gurun, a former Sergeant Major of the legendary North Borneo Constabulary from Kampung Dangulad Keningau. It was unveiled and officiated on 31 August 1964. On the stone is a plaque setting out the federal government's promises to the people of Sabah, as well as the reciprocal promise of Sabahans to remain loyal to the federal government. The stone is in the compound of the Keningau District Office.

Crocker Range National Park
Crocker Range National Park covers 1,399 km2, making it the largest park in Sabah. The park consists of hill and montane forest, with many species of flora and fauna endemic to Borneo. Maintenance of this forest cover is essential to ensuring a pure water supply for many of the towns and communities in Sabah.

The park contains at least five species of primates, such as orang-utans, gibbons, furry tarsiers, and sociable long-tailed macaques.

Facilities include an exhibition centre, insectarium, fernarium, observation tower, and trekking trail.

Keningau Handicraft Centre 
Also known as Pusat Kraftangan Keningau, it is in Keningau New Town. It just 4.8 km from Keningau town. It is known for its scenic beauty and recreational facilities. It comprises recreational of traditional art, visual art, and all traditional things.

Kapayan Recreation Resources
The recreation resources located at Apin-Apin. It takes 25 minutes from Keningau Town to this location. It also has an alternate road with 26 km for people who want to go there to avoid the crowded traffic jam at the main road.

Matanoi Hill 
Also known as Bukit Matanoi. It is located in Apin - Apin, Keningau. It is 23 km from Keningau town.

Bukit Trig
Bukit Trig is where people can go hiking. It is at Apin-Apin, Keningau, 20.2 km from Keningau Town. It is known for its beauty.

Keningau Mall 
The main shopping area in Keningau is the Keningau Mall. It is a 4 storey building, launched in 2010, located in Keningau Town and is the first shopping mall in the Interior Division of Sabah.

Tamu Ground Keningau

Tamu Ground Keningau is a weekly market held twice a week, Thursday and Sunday. As early as 5 am, traders begin to set up their stalls on Tamu Ground open space. Stalls available selling fresh local crops, freshwater fishes, seafoods, cheap gadgets and even souvenirs. Keningau's weekly tamu is a great place to experience the original local North weekly market scene.

Communications and transportation

Road 
Keningau is along the following highways:
 Kota Kinabalu-Papar-Kimanis-Keningau (Kimanis-Keningau Highway)
 Kota Kinabalu-Tambunan-Keningau-Tenom) (Malaysia Federal Route 500)
 Ranau-Tambunan-Keningau-Tenom-Kemabong (Interior North-South Highway)
 Keningau-Sook-Nabawan-Kalabakan-Tawau
 Keningau-Sook-Tulid-Telupid-Sandakan (Keningau-Sandakan Highway)

Public transportation 
Long-distance coaches link Keningau with the cities of Kota Kinabalu, Sandakan, Lahad Datu and Tawau. In the town, public transportation is provided by minibuses and taxis.

Air 

Keningau Airport (Malay: Lapangan Terbang Keningau)  was last serviced by commercial flights in the 1970s. It is currently under private ownership.

Radio 
Keningau has its own radio station, Keningau FM (which is government-owned and operated by RTM), the national public broadcaster (with frequency of 94.70 MHz or 98.40 MHz) with shows in Malay, Murut and Dusun languages. Keningau can connect to other radio station such as Ai FM, TraXX FM, Klasik FM, Nasional FM, Sabah FM & Sabah V FM. Some places in Keningau can connect to Astro Radio, Hitz FM, Era FM and MY FM. In addition, VOK FM is the first commercial radio station to launch in Keningau on 106.6 MHz

Public services

Courts of law and legal enforcement 
The Keningau court complex is on Jalan Nyamok (Nyamok Road). It houses the High, Sessions, and Magistrates courts.

The police headquarters is on Jalan OKK Sodomon (OKK Sodomon Road). There are police substations or pondok polis (literally 'police huts') in Apin-Apin, Bingkor and Sook.

Healthcare 

There are plenty of public health clinics, one public hospital, one maternal and child health clinic, four village clinics, one mobile clinic and one 1Malaysia clinic in Keningau.

Keningau Hospital is a 212-bed hospital and it is a district hospital providing specialist services for outpatients and inpatients. It is the main hospital in the Interior Division and is visited by patients from the surrounding districts of Nabawan, Sook, Pensiangan, Tambunan and Tenom.

There are many pharmacies available in Keningau.

Libraries 

The Keningau Regional Library is one of three regional libraries in Sabah, the others being in Sandakan and Tawau. These libraries are operated by the Sabah State Library.

Sports 

The Keningau Sports Complex has facilities for badminton, tennis, volleyball and basketball as well as two stadiums for hockey and football. There is a 25m swimming pool. It hosted the 5th Sabah Games (SAGA) in 2011 and 9th Sabah Games (SAGA) in 2019.

Keningau Football Stadium has a capacity of 10,000. It is the home stadium for KDMM F.C.

Education 

There are many government or state schools in and around the town. The primary school in the town was
 Sekolah Kebangsaan Ambual
 Sekolah Kebangsaan St.James
 Sekolah Kebangsaan Apin-Apin
 Sekolah Kebangsaan Banjar
 Sekolah Kebangsaan Batu Lunguyan
 Sekolah Kebangsaan Rancangan Biah
 Sekolah Kebangsaan Binaong
 Sekolah Kebangsaan Bingkor
 Sekolah Kebangsaan Bonor
 Sekolah Kebangsaan Bulu Silou
 Sekolah Kebangsaan Bundu Apin-Apin
 Sekolah Kebangsaan Bunsit
 Sekolah Kebangsaan Kawakaan
 Sekolah Kebangsaan Dalit
 Sekolah Kebangsaan Delayan Tulid
 Sekolah Kebangsaan Kabatang Baru
 Sekolah Kebangsaan Kalampun
 Sekolah Kebangsaan Kampong Baru
 Sekolah Kebangsaan Kampong Biah
 Sekolah Kebangsaan Kampong Keningau
 Sekolah Kebangsaan Karamatoi
 Sekolah Kebangsaan Jaya Baru
 Sekolah Kebangsaan Pekan Keningau
 Sekolah Kebangsaan Inandung
 Sekolah Kebangsaan Bariawa Ulu
 Sekolah Kebangsaan Kapayan Baru

 Sekolah Kebangsaan Lanas
 Sekolah Kebangsaan Liau Apin-Apin
 Sekolah Kebangsaan Luagan
 Sekolah Kebangsaan Magatang
 Sekolah Kebangsaan Mansiat
 Sekolah Kebangsaan Membulu
 Sekolah Kebangsaan Menawo
 Sekolah Kebangsaan Merampong
 Sekolah Kebangsaan Mamagun
 Sekolah Kebangsaan Pasir Putih
 Sekolah Kebangsaan Pohon Batu
 Sekolah Kebangsaan Kuala Kahaba
 Sekolah Kebangsaan Senagang
 Sekolah Kebangsaan Sinaron Tengah
 Sekolah Kebangsaan Sodomon
 Sekolah Kebangsaan Sook
 Sekolah Kebangsaan Membulu
 Sekolah Kebangsaan Tuarid Taud
 Sekolah Kebangsaan Tulid
 Sekolah Kebangsaan Ulu Liawan
 Sekolah Kebangsaan Ansip
 Sekolah Kebangsaan Malima
 Sekolah Kebangsaan Penagatan
 Sekolah Kebangsaan Sinua
 Sekolah Kebangsaan Meninipir
 Sekolah Kebangsaan Malaing
 Sekolah Kebangsaan Bunga Raya
 Sekolah Kebangsaan Sinulihan Baru
 Sekolah Kebangsaan Simbuan Tulid
 Sekolah Kebangsaan Ulu Senagang
 Sekolah Kebangsaan Gaulan
 Sekolah Kebangsaan Petikang Laut Keningau
 Sekolah Kebangsaan Binuwou Tengah
 Sekolah Kebangsaan Rancangan Belia Tuilon
 Sekolah Kebangsaan Binakaan
 Sekolah Kebangsaan Bunang Sook
 Sekolah Kebangsaan Lintuhun Baru
 Sekolah Kebangsaan Nangkawangan
 Sekolah Kebangsaan Nandagan
 Sekolah Kebangsaan Binanon
 Sekolah Kebangsaan Pangas
 Sekolah Menengah Kebangsaan Keningau II
 Sekolah Jenis Kebangsaan (C) Yuk Yin
 Sekolah Jenis Kebangsaan (C) Yuk Kong
 Sekolah Jenis Kebangsaan (C) Cheng Ming

For the secondary schools
Sekolah Menengah Kebangsaan Agama (SMKA) Keningau
 Sekolah Menengah Jenis Kebangsaan Ken Hwa
 Sekolah Menengah Kebangsaan Apin-Apin
 Sekolah Menengah Kebangsaan Bingkor
 Sekolah Menengah Kebangsaan Gunsanad
 Sekolah Menengah Kebangsaan Gunsanad II
 Sekolah Menengah Kebangsaan Keningau
 Sekolah Menengah Kebangsaan Keningau II
 Sekolah Menengah Kebangsaan Sook
 Sekolah Menengah Kebangsaan St. Francis Xavier
 Sekolah Menengah Kebangsaan Tulid
 Kolej Vokasional Keningau

For higher/tertiary education, there are GIATMARA Keningau, Geomatika Commercial College and Sidma College. Universities such as the Open University Malaysia and UNITAR University have a campus here. Kolej Vokasional Keningau (KV Keningau) also offer higher education in diploma level.

Culture and leisure 

The main shopping area in Keningau is the Keningau Mall. Launched in 2010, it is located in Keningau Town and become the first shopping mall in Interior Division. In 2016, a new mall called Keningau Giant Mall has been launched and become the second main shopping destination for Keningau. It is located at the central of Keningau New Town.

A new project a new mall with 400 units of store will develop in the future in Keningau, the rumours name of the new mall is Aeon Mall Keningau Shopping Centre. This mall will share similarities as Imago KK Times Square in Kota Kinabalu and become the biggest shopping mall in Interior Division after Keningau Mall and will become the first Aeon Mall located in Sabah.

Cuisine
Keningau offer wide choices of popular local delicacies such as Char Kway Teow, Chinese Dim Sum, Nasi Lemak and local Kuih Muih

There are also variety of restaurants/vendors in Keningau that offer Western food, Chinese, Indian, Muslim, Japanese, even Indonesian and Philippines cuisines.

Many Muslim-owned Mamak Stall open for 24 hours that offer varieties of Indian food throughout the city

Fast food restaurant also available such as KFC, Pizza Hut, McDonald's.

Other franchise found includes Secret Recipe, Tealive, Share Tea, U-Tea

Notable residents 
 Architecture & Engineering   
 Garukon Gurun, the designer of the Keningau Oath Stone
 Gounon Lulus, the builder of the North Borneo Railway from Jesselton to Tenom with Arthur Joseph West

 Economics & Business
 Datuk Arthur Joseph Kurup JP, economist, lawyer, politician (current MP of Pensiangan)

 Entertainment
 Daphne Iking, Malaysian TV personality (birthplace and maternal hometown, paternal hometown in Tambunan)

 Politics
 Tun Ahmad Koroh, governor and head of state of Sabah (Yang di-Pertua Negeri of Sabah)
 Tun Adnan Robert, governor and head of state of Sabah (Yang di-Pertua Negeri of Sabah)
 Tan Sri Joseph Kurup, politician, lawyer
 Tan Sri Datuk Seri Panglima Musa Aman, businessman, politician (maternal hometown, paternal hometown in Beaufort district)
 Datuk Seri Panglima Dr. Maximus Ongkili, politician, researcher (settled only in this town during his adolescence for his secondary education, but his hometown is still in Tambunan)
 Datuk Orang Kaya Kaya (OKK) Sedomon Gunsanad Kina, the founding member of the Federation of Malaysia, the epigraphist of the Oath Stone and 20 Point
 Datuk Stephen R. Evans, politician, public administrator and author

 Sports
 Alto Linus, Sabah and Malaysian footballer
 Maxsius Musa,  Sabah and Malaysian footballer

See also 
 Datuk Seri Panglima O.K.K. Gunsanad Kina
 Keningau Airport
 Kimanis-Keningau Highway

References

External links 

Keningau District
Towns in Sabah